Gulf Traveller was the all-economy full service subsidiary airline of Gulf Air. Its main base was Abu Dhabi International Airport. It was briefly relocated between Bahrain and Muscat airports after Abu Dhabi pulled out of the Gulf Air consortium in 2005, and in May 2007 Oman also pulled out of the group leaving Bahrain as sole owner of Gulf Air. Gulf Traveller has since been disbanded due to these changes.

History

Gulf Traveller was founded on 1 June 2003 as part of the Gulf Air three year restructuring and turnaround programme instigated by James Hogan. The model behind Gulf Air was to economise on routes with little demand for First or Business Class passengers. Gulf Traveller's inaugural flight between Abu Dhabi and Jeddah took place on 15 June 2003.

Gulf Traveller planned to add Birmingham, United Kingdom, to its list of destinations in 2004, however, the project was put on hold for the foreseeable future in 2005, and then eventually scrapped.

Former destinations
Gulf Traveller operated to the following;

 (hub)
 - Dhaka
 - Mumbai, Thiruvananthapuram
 - Jakarta
 - Amman
 - Nairobi
 - Kathmandu
 - Muscat (hub)
 - Islamabad, Karachi, Lahore, Peshawar
 - Dammam, Jeddah, Riyadh
 - Dar es Salaam, Zanzibar
 - Abu Dhabi

Fleet
The Gulf Traveller Fleet consisted of the following aircraft (as of March 2007):

6 Boeing 767-3P6ER

References 

Defunct airlines of Bahrain
Airlines established in 2003
Airlines disestablished in 2007
2007 disestablishments in Bahrain
Bahraini companies established in 2003